Isanbayevo (İśänbay) is a rural locality (a selo) in Izhboldinsky Selsoviet, Yanaulsky District, Bashkortostan, Russia. The population was 172 as of 2010. There are 5 streets.

Geography 
Isanbayevo is located 33 km southeast of Yanaul (the district's administrative centre) by road. Izhboldino is the nearest rural locality.

References 

Rural localities in Yanaulsky District